Department of Islamic Development Malaysia (Malay: Jabatan Kemajuan Islam Malaysia , Jawi alphabet: جابتن كماجوان اسلام مليسيا) or popularly known as JAKIM, is a federal government agency in Malaysia that administers Islamic affairs in Malaysia.

History 
In 1969, the Conference of the Conference of Rulers of Malaysia decided that there was a need for a body to mobilize the development and progress of Muslims in Malaysia, in line with the status of Malaysia as a growing Islamic country and gaining international attention.

Realizing this fact, a secretariat to the National Council of Islamic Religious Affairs Malaysia (MKI) was established, to preserve the purity of Islamic beliefs and teachings. The secretariat was later developed as the Religious Division, the Prime Minister's Department which was then re-promoted to the Islamic Affairs Division (Malay: Bahagian Hal Ehwal Islam) (BAHEIS).

On 1 January 1997, in line with the growing development and progress of Islam in the country, the Department of Islamic Development Malaysia (JAKIM) was established by the Malaysian government as taking over power and role of BAHEIS.

Function 
The Department of Islamic Development Malaysia, the Prime Minister's Department plays a central role in the planning of Islamic Affairs management and development of the Ummah with the following functions:

 Responsible as a planner who determines the development and progress of Islamic Affairs in Malaysia;

 Formulate a policy for the development of Islamic Affairs in the country and maintain the purity of Islamic beliefs and teachings

 Assist in formulating and harmonizing the necessary laws and regulations as well as evaluating and coordinating the implementation of existing laws and administration in the efforts to resolve problems of Muslims;

 Implement ummah development programs and appreciation of Islam in the management of the country;

 Coordinate legal enforcement mechanisms as well as regulatory affairs of Islamic Affairs nationwide;

 Evaluate Islamic Affairs programs implemented in the country;

 Acting as a collector, disseminator and reference center of information on Islamic affairs; and

 Implement community development efforts through regional and international cooperation.

Organisation structure 

The department consists of three main sectors, namely Policy Sector, Operations Sector and Management Sector.

The Policy Sector is divided into six Divisions:

 Islamic Development Policy division
 Research division
 Coordination of Shariah Enforcement and Prosecution division
 External Affairs and Relationships division
 Halal Management division
 Maqasid Syariah division

The Operations Sector is divided into five divisions:

 Dawah division
 Family, Social and Community division
 Publications division
 Broadcasting division - Known as the Radio and Television Dawah Units of state broadcaster Radio Televisyen Malaysia (RTM) before their transfer to the Islamic Affairs division of the Prime Minister Department on 1 June 1994. It is responsible for producing religious programmings for RTM's radio and television channels. Its radio channel – Salam FM was established on 15 February 2009 and broadcast from Wisma Radio in Angkasapuri, Kuala Lumpur from 11:00pm to 8:00am, sharing the same frequency as Asyik FM.
 Education division

The Management Sector is divided into four divisions:

 Human Resource Management division
 Financial division
 Information Management division
 Management Services division

The following organisations are placed directly under the Director General of Jakim: 

 Islamic Training Institute of Malaysia (Malay Institut Latihan Islam Malaysia (ILIM)
 Legal Division
 Secretary of the Malaysian Halal Council 
 Darul Quran
 Sarawak Islamic Skills Institute (Malay:Institut Kemahiran Islam Malaysia Sarawak) (IKMAS) 
 Sabah Institute of Islamic Studies and Dawah (Malay:Institut Pengajian Islam dan Dakwah Sabah) (IPDAS)
 JAKIM (Sabah branch)
 JAKIM (Sarawak branch)
 Corporate Communication unit
 Integrity Unit 

The three main mosques are placed under the JAKIM Preaching Division:

 Masjid Negara
 Masjid Putra
 Masjid Tuanku Mizan Zainal Abidin

List of Directors-General

Since formation of JAKIM, 9 peoples was appointed in this position with currently leading by Hakimah Mohd Yusof, the first women appointed with this position.

Legalisation

The formation of JAKIM faced criticism from many groups claiming the established was outlawed by constitution of Malaysia. G25, a group of representing of former civil servant said the established of JAKIM was not aligned with constitution as power of the Conference of Rulers does not include the formation of JAKIM cited of Article 38 of the constitution. However, former Prime Minister, Mahathir Mohamad defended the formation of JAKIM by citing it was aimed at bringing the government in line with Islamic teachings. His statement was supported by Mujahid Yusof Rawa, former Minister in the Prime Minister's Department (Religious Affairs) quoted it was set up to cater to the current needs, including when it comes to managing the budget for the administration of Islamic matters.

Reference 

1997 establishments in Malaysia
Islamic organisations based in Malaysia
Organisations based in Putrajaya
Federal ministries, departments and agencies of Malaysia